The defending champions were Hana Mandlíková and Martina Navratilova, but Mandliková chose not to participate. Navratilova partnered Arantxa Sanchez Vicario and successfully defended her title, defeating Mercedes Paz and Natalia Zvereva in the final, 6–2, 6–1.

Seeds 
The top four seeds received a bye to the second round.

Draw

Finals

Top half

Bottom half

References

External links 
 [ ITF tournament edition details]

Virginia Slims of Chicago
Ameritech Cup
Virginia Slims of Chicago